Louse Creek is a stream in Lincoln County, Tennessee, in the United States.

Accounts on why the creek was so named differ. Some believe someone said the creek was lousy, while others believe a local child had head lice.

See also
List of rivers of Tennessee

References

Rivers of Lincoln County, Tennessee
Rivers of Tennessee